Hareesh Perumanna , known by his stage name Hareesh Kanaran, is an Indian comedian and film actor who appears in Malayalam films. He is best known for his stock character Jaliyan Kanaran which first appeared in Comedy Festival, a comedy reality show in Mazhavil Manorama.

Personal life 
Hareesh was born at Perumanna village in Kozhikode district of Kerala, India. He had his primary education at Ganapath Boys School in Kozhikode. He performed in the drama Naatam on school youth festival which was ranked first in the drama category. Hareesh married Sandhya, a school teacher and they have a son named Dhyan Hari and a daughter.

Career 
Hareesh began his career as a mimicry artist in a troupe named "Calicut Friends". He later joined troupes such as Calicut Super Jokes and V4 Calicut. He made his television debut in the Malayalam comedy reality show, Comedy Festival, aired in Mazhavil Manorama. His character as Jalianwala Kanaran made him a popular figure among the audiences. He made his film debut in the 2014 Malayalam film, Ulsaha Committee.

Filmography

Awards and nominations

References

External links 
 
 

Living people
People from Kozhikode district
Male actors from Kozhikode
Male actors in Malayalam cinema
Indian male film actors
Male actors from Kerala
Malayalam comedians
Indian male comedians
Indian stand-up comedians
21st-century Indian male actors
Year of birth missing (living people)